Pirate Master is an American reality television show created by Mark Burnett and broadcast on CBS. The show followed sixteen modern-day pirates on their quest for a gold treasure valued at US$1,000,000. The show was hosted by Cameron Daddo and was filmed around and on the Caribbean island nation of Dominica.

Pirate Master premiered Thursday, May 31, 2007. The show also aired on CTV in Canada and Sky3 in the UK, and premiered on June 21, 2007, on Network Ten in Australia, and on July 4, 2007, on AXN Asia. Due to low ratings, CBS cancelled Pirate Master on July 24, 2007 after airing only eight of its 14 episodes. Following this, the series was posted on CBS Innertube, with the last six episodes debuting each week on Tuesday mornings.

Premise
Pirate Master is centered around a fictional story of the pirate captain Henry Steel and the Treasure of Zanzibar. After acquiring the treasure, Steel divided the loot into 14 parts and hid them across the island of Dominica. A special chest, the Chest of Zanzibar, contains fifteen locked compartments, each containing maps and clues to help find one of the stashes. Fourteen of the keys — all but the key for the first compartment — are each hidden with one of the hidden treasures; thus, the treasures must be found, and the compartments opened, in a predetermined order. The final compartment contains a map showing the location of every gold stash on the island of Dominica, leading to the grand prize.

Expeditions

Each week, the contestants are divided into two crews, Black and Red, to hunt for the treasures indicated by the maps and clues obtained from the most recently opened compartment in the Chest of Zanzibar. If the captain and officer positions are occupied (see below), they are automatically assigned to the black crew, while all remaining players draw colored gunshots out of bags to determine their crew. The black crew gains the extra player when an odd number of contestants are available.

Both crews simultaneously go on expeditions and decipher clues along the way to find gold coins hidden around the island of Dominica. During the expedition, there is the potential for the currently leading crew (based on the trailing member of the team) to "sabotage" the other crew, slowing them down, such as by causing a net to fall to block passage along a river. There also may be booby traps that can slow down the leading team. The first crew to successfully retrieve the treasure — even if the other crew arrived and started searching first — wins the treasure, and indicates their victory by firing a blunderbuss.

Captain and Officers 
Following the first expedition, the winning crew must elect one of their own to be the ship's captain. The captain must then select two crew-mates to be officers. The captain receives the right to claim half of the treasure for themself, in additional to other luxuries, but must also nominate three contestants for elimination. The officers each receive a smaller share of the treasure, and claim lesser luxuries.

After being elected, the captain leads the black crew on the next expedition. If the black crew wins, the captain retains their position automatically and may opt to keep or change their officers as desired. If the red crew wins, the captain and officers are all demoted; the crew-mates on the winning team then elect from among themselves a new captain, who chooses two new officers. When eight contestants remain, the officer position is eliminated entirely.

Treasure 
Most of the treasure found at the end of each expedition comes in the form of gold coins, which can be divided among the winning crew. After the coins are counted and the total value (which varies) is established, the captain claims 50%, the officers share 25%, and the rest of the winning crew members share the remaining 25% of the gold; when necessary, distributions are rounded to the nearest $100. The coins are distributed to the crew members immediately, and may be used as in-game currency, allowing the contestants to strike deals with each other and vie for long-term security. This money cannot be stolen by other players. Of the total $1 million prize, $500,000 was distributed through the show in this manner.

Pirates' Court

At the end of each episode, all contestants attend Pirates' Court to determine who will be eliminated. Prior to a court proceeding, the Captain distributes letters to the other contestants, three of which contain a black ink blot (called a "black spot"). The three contestants receiving black spots are nominated to be voted off and cannot take part in the voting process that follows; the captain and officers are not allowed to vote either. The remaining crew members then cast their votes by impaling their ballots on an upturned dagger. The contestant with the most votes is then "cut adrift" (i.e., voted off the show). In case of a tie, the captain decides which of the tied players he will cast adrift. However, contestants may instead opt to cast their vote for mutiny against the captain. Should the voting contestants do so unanimously, then the officers will individually vote for or against the mutiny; if they both agree with the crew, the Captain will be cut adrift. If either officer disagrees with the mutiny, the mutiny fails, and the captain can then choose any player (including among those that were not originally nominated) to be set adrift.

The fourth episode introduced a "Royal Pardon" found in the treasure. Prior to the distribution of the next Black Spot letters, any player (including the captain and officers) may bid secretly for the pardon. At the Pirates' Court, after the votes have been placed, the winning bid of the pardon is announced, and the bid amount is paid to whoever previously held the pardon. If the player holding the pardon receives the most votes, that player is safe, and the next highest vote earner is cut adrift, and the pardon is removed from the game. If the pardon-holder does not receive the most votes, they retain the pardon but must sell it to a different player via silent auction by the next Pirates' Court. The Royal Pardon is removed from the game after the ninth Pirate Court, whether it's used or not.

When there are eight players remaining, the captain selects two players for Black Spots. Because there are no officers, a unanimous vote for mutiny will result in the captain being set adrift immediately.

Ghost Crew
The eighth episode introduced a "Ghost Crew" made up of the previously eliminated players. On episode 8, the remaining players in the game compete as a single Black Crew against the Ghost Crew. Should the Black Crew win, the rest of the game played out as normal. If the Ghost Crew should win, they not only keep the treasure, but get to decide which three of the remaining players would get the Black Spot for the Pirate's Court, and there would be no Captain or Officers until the next expedition.

The Ghost Crew, now incorporating all eliminated players up to that point, returned in the Finale to eliminate one of the final three.

End Game
When only three competitors are left, an expedition is performed, with each player competing against the others. The first player to the treasure becomes Captain and receives the expedition's treasure, and is guaranteed to be competing for Captain Steele's bounty. The other two players face a Pirate's Court made up of the previously eliminated players, who ultimately decide which player joins the Captain in the final expedition.

The final two players, prior to the final expedition, each select three additional crew members from the previously eliminated contestants to assist them on the expedition. The final expedition includes portions that only the finalist can perform in addition to where teamwork can be used. The finalist who is the first to find Captain Steele's treasure wins $500k and the title of Pirate Master.

Features
The show is notable for its evocative setting and props. Much of the show takes place on the ship, called the Picton Castle, but the contestants also disembark and explore island rivers and muddy riverbanks in search of gold. Skeletons, keys, and other pirate-themed paraphernalia are scattered about the foggy island environment.

Other stereotypical pirate-like features include pirate-themed music, pirate-like clothing (note that the captain and the officers don garments signifying their superior rank), and the performance of laborious chores aboard the ship. The ship's main mast sports a Jolly Roger, stylized with a Pirate Master logo.

The ship itself was manned by the real crew of the Picton Castle, though the contestants did assist with manning the sails and other tasks.

Contestants

Episodes

Weekly Crew Assignments

Voting history

Critical reception
Pirate Master did not perform well in ratings, drawing in only 7 million viewers on the premiere episode, and subsequent showings drawing in less. Joshua Alston of Newsweek called the debut episode a "confusing muddle". Some critics have considered that the failure of both Pirate Master and On the Lot represent not only troubling issues for Mark Burnett, but for reality television as well.
In the UK from episode 5 onward, the show was moved from its Sunday night primetime slot on Sky's main entertainment channel Sky1 to Monday nights at 6 p.m. on Sky3; a channel which usually only shows content from Sky1 but on a 12-18 month delay. The final episodes were aired on Sky3 at 7 a.m. on a Saturday morning. In Australia, free-to-air Channel Ten moved the show from its 7.30 p.m. Tuesday timeslot to Sunday afternoons on July 27. CBS moved the show from Thursday at 8 p.m. to Tuesday at 10 p.m. After continued low ratings, CBS canceled Pirate Master on July 23, 2007 and aired the remaining episodes on CBS Innertube.

Despite being removed from American television in mid-run, the show went on to win an Emmy award in the category of outstanding original main title theme music.

Post Show
Cheryl Kosewicz, the fourth person to leave the game, was found dead inside her home on July 27, 2007, after an apparent suicide. The show paid respects to her death in the final episode with a brief blackscreen dedication message before the final credits. On fellow contestant Nessa's MySpace webpage, Cheryl blamed the show for causing friction between herself and her boyfriend, who committed suicide two months prior.

Footnotes
: Booty awards are based only on the amount of money directly given to each player as a result of winning the treasure hunt. Booty that may be exchanged afterward is not counted in this column, due to the inability to verify these amounts from the show as presented; however, the CBS Pirate Master Wiki includes a "Treasure Tracker". that may include these values.

: In the event of a tie, the Captain decides who is to be cut adrift.

References

External links
 Official Website (via Internet Archive)
 
 Official Site
 Pirate Master on Network Ten Australia
 Pirate Master on AXN Asia
 Pirate Master Coverage at Reality Blurred
 Pirate Master Recaps at My Ox Is Broken
 Pirate Master Discussion at the Survivor Sucks Forum
 Pirate Master Discussion at Reality TV World
 Episodes of Pirate Master

2000s American reality television series
2007 American television series debuts
2007 American television series endings
CBS original programming
2000s American game shows
Television series created by Mark Burnett
Television shows filmed in Dominica